Michael Lamont Archie (born October 14, 1972, Sharon, Pennsylvania, United States) is a former professional American football player who played running back in the NFL and XFL.

Professional football
Archie was the 7th round draft pick (#218 overall) of the Houston Oilers in 1996. He played for the Oilers/Tennessee Titans for 3 seasons. He spent the 1999 season on injured reserve and negotiated an injury settlement and release from the Titans in 2000. He played with the New York/New Jersey Hitmen of the newly formed XFL for their only season in 2001.

College
As a tailback at Penn State, Archie rushed for 1,830 yards and 14 touchdowns. His 77 receptions for eight touchdowns is a school record for running backs. He was a key contributor in Penn State's 1993 Citrus Bowl and 1994 Rose Bowl victory, the latter of which capped an undefeated season for the Nittany Lions.

He earned his Bachelor of Science in Hotel Restaurant and Institutional Management from the university in 1996.

Personal
Archie lives in Brentwood, Tennessee with his wife, Crystal, and their 7 children.  Mike and Crystal are representatives for Rodan and Fields today and are active in the community

Trivia
Nickname is "Spanky"'
He is best remembered for his comment during Super Bowl XXXIV, "Just gimme the ball, Coach!  Just gimme the ball!"
Was named 1992 Pennsylvania Player of the Year by USA Today as senior at Sharon High School in Sharon, Pennsylvania.
Inducted into the Mercer County Hall of Fame in 2020.

References

1972 births
American football running backs
Players of American football from Pennsylvania
Houston Oilers players
Living people
Penn State Nittany Lions football players
People from Sharon, Pennsylvania
Sportspeople from Pennsylvania
Tennessee Oilers players
Tennessee Titans players
New York/New Jersey Hitmen players